The Metro Pace is one of the premier harness racing events in North America for two-year-old Standardbred pacers. First run in 1988 at Woodbine Racetrack in Toronto, Ontario, in several of the ensuing years it was hosted by Mohawk Raceway in Campbellville, Ontario where it has been run exclusively since 2005.

Historical race events
The 1990 Metro Pace winner, Artsplace, was the first horse to ever win and sire a Metro Pace winner, his sons doing it twice in 1998 (Grinfromeartoear) and again in 1999 (The Firepan).

Son of 2007 Metro Pace winner Somebeachsomewhere, Captaintreacherous captured the 2012 edition.

Records
 Most wins by a driver
 7 – John Campbell (1990, 1996, 1999, 2000) 

 Most wins by a trainer
 2 – Tony Alagna  (2012, 2014)

 Stakes record
 1:49 2/5 – Sportswriter (2009) & Captaintreacherous (2012)

Winners of the Metro Pace

References

1988 establishments in Canada
Harness racing in Canada
Mohawk Racetrack
Recurring sporting events established in 1988